Pinqullu (Aymara for a kind of flute of the Andes, Hispanicized spelling Pincullo) is a  mountain in the Chunta mountain range in the Andes of Peru. It lies in the Huancavelica Region, Huancavelica Province, Ascensión District, northwest of Antarasu. The river Kachimayu originates southwest of the mountain. It flows along the southern slopes of Pinqullu. Yawarqucha ("blood lake", Yahuarcocha) is the name of the little lake southwest of the peak.

References

Mountains of Huancavelica Region
Mountains of Peru